NCAA Season 81 was the 2005–06 season of the National Collegiate Athletic Association (Philippines). Colegio de San Juan de Letran was the season's host.

To usher in the new season, Letran and the other NCAA member schools performed the opening ceremonies at the Araneta Coliseum, followed by four basketball games on June 25, 2005. Other disciplines started their own tournaments within the following months, with beach volleyball as the last tournament on mid-March.

De La Salle-College of Saint Benilde won its first General Championship honors for the Seniors division, while the San Sebastian Recoletos High School won its second Juniors General Championship, via tiebreakers, when La Salle Green Hills emerged with an equal number of points.

Basketball

Men's tournament

Elimination round

Playoffs

Individual awards
Most Valuable Player: Ernie Jay Sagad (CSB)
Rookie of the Year: Kelvin dela Peña (Mapua)

Juniors basketball tournament

Elimination round

Playoffs

Individual awards
Most Valuable Player: Allan Mangahas (PCU-Union)
Rookie of the Year: Darell Green (Letran)

Other sports and General Championship

Championship results
Arranged by order of conclusion:

Juniors division

Seniors division
 
¹ Not a part in the tabulation of the General Championship

General Championship

Seniors division

Juniors division

¹ Since San Sebastian had more championships (4) than LSGH (3), San Sebastian won the General Championship, despite being tied for first place.
² Mapua did not send representatives in the Juniors division

See also
UAAP Season 68

NCAA Philippines
81
2006 in multi-sport events
2005 in Philippine sport
2006 in Philippine sport